Beau Bassin-Rose Hill (or Beau-Bassin Rose-Hill;) is a town in Mauritius, located in the Plaines Wilhems District. It is administered by the Municipal Council of Beau Bassin-Rose Hill and has a population of 147,066 habitants, making it the third largest city on the island.

Politics

Municipal Elections
Municipal elections are held every 6 years, the mandate of the Lord Mayor and the Deputy Mayor is two years, then another one is chosen by the members of the board through a system of voting. For the Municipal elections held in November 2012, the town of Beau-Bassin Rose-Hill was divided into 6 wards compare to 4 previously.

Sports

The football team which represents the town is the Union Sportive de Beau-Bassin Rose-Hill, its home stadium is the Sir Gaetan Duval Stadium, the team currently plays in the National First Division for the 2014–2015 season.

Education
John Kennedy College
St Mary's College
Loreto College Rose Hill
St Andrew's School
Collège de La Confiance
Queen Elizabeth College
New Devton College
SSS Beau-Bassin
New Eton College
Institut Cardinal Jean Margéot (Maison de Carné)

Suburbs
The town of Beau Bassin-Rose Hill is divided into different regions:
 Beau-Bassin
 Camp-Levieux
 Coromandel
 Lower Beau-Bassin
 Mont-Roches
 Roches-Brunes 
 Rose-Hill
 Stanley 
 Trèfles
 Barkly

Twin towns – sister cities
Beau-Bassin Rose-Hill is twinned with:
  Changzhou
  Saint-Pierre, Réunion
  Quartier Militaire

See also 

 Jardin Balfour (Mauritius)
 List of places in Mauritius
 The regional news website of the town

References

External links 
 http://bbrh.org/

Beau Bassin-Rose Hill